The Gardener is a picture book by American children's book author Sarah Stewart, illustrated by her husband, David Small. The story, about a young girl and her rooftop garden in the city, is set in the Depression era and told through an epistolary style. It was published in 1997 by Farrar, Straus and Giroux.

Awards and honors
School Library Journal’s Top 100 Picture Books (2012)
Caldecott Honor Book (1998)
New York Times Book Review Notable Children's Book of the Year (1997)

References

American picture books
1997 children's books
Fiction set in the 1930s
Caldecott Honor-winning works